Arie Sandy (born January 6, 1997), is an Indonesian professional footballer who plays as defensive midfielder, he can also operate as a defender.

Club career

Barito Putera 
Arie joined the squad for the event Indonesia Soccer Championship. Arie made his debut when facing against Persipura Jayapura on the sixth week Indonesia Soccer Championship A 2016.

Honours

Club
PSS Sleman
 Liga 2: 2018

References

External links 
 Arie Sandy at Soccerway

1997 births
Living people
Indonesian footballers
Association football midfielders
Sportspeople from Makassar
PSS Sleman players
PS Barito Putera players
21st-century Indonesian people